Kollam Port Road or Port Road, Kollam is a four lane road in the city of Kollam, India. The  road connects historic Port of Quilon (Kollam Port) and Vaddy with Kochupilamoodu in the city through Kollam Beach.

History
A detailed plan for constructing a four lane road to connect century-old Port of Quilon with Kollam city was first suggested by P. K. Gurudasan, the then Labour minister of Kerala state, in 2007. V. S. Achuthanandan lead LDF ministry had sanctioned fund in 2009-2010 Kerala budget, to take over 71.5 cents of land from Kochupilammoodu bridge road to the Port road from private parties and also sanctioned Rs.2.43 crore for road construction works. On 16 February 2016, the site was transferred for construction and the works completed on 2016 December 31. The road was inaugurated by Kerala Port Minister Kadannappalli Ramachandran on 19 September 2017.

The road project
The first phase of the road, between Vaddy and Kollam Port had been completed in 2010. The total estimated project cost including phase-II is Rs.13.52 crores.

Current Status 
The four-laning works have completed in a 1.7 km stretch between Tangasseri Bus Terminal and Kollam Port. From Kollam Port to Vaddy Kadappuram 600 metres of this road is yet to be widened. The four-laning works remaining 500 metre stretch of the road from Vaddy Kadappuram till Kochupilamoodu bridge near Kollam Beach is also completed.

However, in-order to make the freight movement to the port from National Highway 66 (India) , National Highway 744 (India), National Waterway 3 easier widening and four laning of

 Tangasseri Bus Terminal - Ammachiveedu - Vellayittambalam - Kavanad road,
 Kochupilamoodu - Kappalandimukku - Mevaram
 Kollam Inland Port Asramam - Kappalandimukku road and
Dredging and improvement on Kollam Canal from Kollam Inland Port Asramam till Kochupilamoodu are necessary.

Gallery

See also

 Roads in Kerala
 Kollam
 Kollam Port
 Kollam Beach

References

Roads in Kollam